This is a list of the All-Time Roster of Tampa Bay Buccaneers players. To appear on the list, the player must have been on the active roster for at least one regular season game, even if they did not play in that game.

Sorting information
Left click on top headings to sort by name, position, college, number of seasons, years played, number of games played or games started.
After sorting you can select a starting letter from table of contents.
To see all players that came from a college in the order they played, left click Years played, then left click college. Select starting letter in table of contents to quicken search.Reload to return to original listing.

All time roster

The games played are complete through the 2021 NFL season.On Bucs Active Roster

References

External links
 

List
Tampa Bay Buccaneers
players